Holger Rune defeated Stefanos Tsitsipas in the final, 6–4, 6–4 to win the singles tennis title at the 2022 Stockholm Open. It was his second career ATP Tour singles title.

Tommy Paul was the defending champion, but lost to Mikael Ymer in the second round.

Seeds
The top four seeds received a bye into the second round.

Draw

Finals

Top half

Bottom half

Qualifying

Seeds

Qualifiers

Qualifying draw

First qualifier

Second qualifier

Third qualifier

Fourth qualifier

References

External links
 Main draw
 Qualifying draw

2022 ATP Tour